Rebelde is a 2004–2006 Mexican telenovela adapted from Rebelde Way.

Rebelde  may refer to:

Music

Albums
Rebelde (album),  a 2004 album by RBD
Rebelde (Edição Brasil), the 2004 Brazilian Portuguese version of the album
Rebelde (soundtrack), a 2012 soundtrack album for the Brazilian soap opera
La Rebelde, a 2005 album by Ninel Conde
Rebelde, a 2002 album by Celso Piña
Rebelde, a 1998 album by Rebeca
Rebelde, a 1990 album by Jerry Rodriguez and Mercedes for SugarHill Recording Studios

Songs
"Rebelde" (song), a song by RBD from Rebelde
"La Rebelde", a song by Ninel Conde
"Rebelde", a song by Hamlet

Other uses
Rebelde (comics), a 2006 comic book series based on the Mexican telenovela
Rebelde (Brazilian TV series), a 2011–2012 Brazilian telenovela adapted from the Mexican telenovela
Rebelde (2022 TV series), a Mexican series based on the Mexican telenovela of the same name that premiered on Netflix in 2022

See also
Rebelde Way, an Argentine soap opera created by Cris Morena, 2002-2003
Soy rebelde, a 1971 Spanish album by singer Jeanette